The Soaring Concepts Sky Trek is an American powered parachute, designed and produced by Soaring Concepts Inc of Sturgis, Michigan and introduced in 2000. The aircraft is supplied as a complete ready-to-fly-aircraft or as a kit for amateur construction.

Design and development
The Sky Trek was designed to comply with the US light-sport aircraft rules and is on the list of Federal Aviation Administration accepted LSAs. It features a  parachute-style wing, two-seats-in-tandem accommodation, tricycle landing gear and a single  Rotax 582 engine in pusher configuration.

The aircraft carriage is built from large-diameter 4130 steel tubing. In flight steering is accomplished via foot pedals that actuate the canopy brakes, creating roll and yaw. On the ground the aircraft has lever-controlled nosewheel steering. The main landing gear incorporates adjustable gas shock suspension.

Operational history
In August 2015, 24 examples were registered in the United States with the Federal Aviation Administration, although a total of 25 had been registered at one time.

Specifications (Sky Trek)

References

External links

Sky Trek
2000s United States sport aircraft
2000s United States ultralight aircraft
Single-engined pusher aircraft
Powered parachutes